Richard Stephen Ziman (born November 5, 1942) is a prominent real estate investor, philanthropist, and Democratic party donor in Southern California.

Early life
Richard Ziman was born on November 5, 1942, in Williamsport, Pennsylvania, the son of Helen and Charlie Ziman. His father, Charles Ziman, was a furniture manufacturer who donated the materials to build a new synagogue in his hometown. Both his parents were Jewish. He has four siblings: brothers, Allan, Curt, Larry, and sister Phyllis. His family moved to Beverly Hills, California in 1958.

Ziman earned a J.D. at USC in 1967.

Career
In 1968, he started a job as an associate with the law firm Loeb & Loeb where he handled real estate including development, syndication and financing. In 1971, he made partner.

In 1980, he left the firm and founded the real estate investment firm, Pacific Financial Group which purchased and redeveloped rundown buildings using non-recourse financing. By 1987, his firm had a portfolio of 5,000,000 square feet and after discovering in 1989 that 2,000,000 square feet of his portfolio contained asbestos, which was just then becoming a concern, he sold off his entire portfolio of Southern California real estate in 19 months reducing his payroll from 90 to 10 employees. The sale was timely as the market crashed in 1990. In 1991, he co-founded with Victor Coleman and Andrew Sobel the Arden Pacific Management Group -  named after the street he grew up on in Beverly Hills. Arden began purchasing, at deep discounts, foreclosed commercial buildings from banks eager to exit from the burdens of property management. The firm focused on properties in good locations in Southern California with small tenants (who did not have a lot of negotiating leverage and would not have a significant impact to Arden's cash flows if they moved) and who had owners willing to provide direct financing of up to 90% of the purchase price. By 1996, Arden had a portfolio of 24 office buildings and 4,000,000 square feet. In October 1996, Arden Realty, Inc. went public on the New York Stock Exchange in a $496 million IPO organized by Lehman Brothers. Subsequent share issuances in July 1997 and February 1998 raised an additional $360 million and $710 million respectively. By 2004, Arden had 200 buildings with 19,000,000 square feet.

Ziman is a prominent Democratic Party contributor. In early 2007, he hosted a fundraiser for Joe Biden. In 2008, he raised enough money for Hillary Clinton to earn the Clinton campaign's designation 'Hillraiser'. He contributed $15,000 to a group to help Florida and Michigan seat their Democratic Party primary election delegates.

References

1942 births
Living people
People from Williamsport, Pennsylvania
People from Beverly Hills, California
Beverly Hills High School alumni
USC Gould School of Law alumni
American real estate brokers
American real estate businesspeople
Philanthropists from California
Jewish American philanthropists
21st-century American Jews